Loricula is a genus of minute bladder bugs in the family Microphysidae. There are more than 20 described species in Loricula.

Species

These 25 species belong to the genus Loricula:

 Loricula bedeli (Montandon, 1887)
 Loricula bipunctata (Perris, 1857)
 Loricula blascoi Ribes & Pericart, 1996
 Loricula distinguenda Reuter, 1884
 Loricula elegantula (Bärensprung, 1858)
 Loricula freyi (Lindberg, 1932)
 Loricula hispanica Pericart, 1972
 Loricula jakovlevi Pericart, 1969
 Loricula josifovi Simov, 2008
 Loricula lundbladi China, 1938
 Loricula meinanderi Pericart, 1972
 Loricula pselaphiformis Curtis, 1833
 Loricula ruficeps (Reuter, 1884)
 Loricula rufoscutellata (Baerensprung, 1857)
 Loricula spec Dames, 1885
 Loricula stenocephala Ribes, 1985
 † Loricula ablusa Popov, 2006
 † Loricula ceranowiczae Popov, 2004
 † Loricula damzeni Popov, 2004
 † Loricula finitima Popov, 2006
 † Loricula heissi Popov, 2006
 † Loricula ocellata Popov, 2006
 † Loricula perkovskyi (Putshkov & Popov, 2003)
 † Loricula polonica Popov & Herczek, 2008
 † Loricula samlandi Popov, 2006

References

Further reading

External links

 

Cimicomorpha genera
Articles created by Qbugbot
Microphysidae